The long-clawed ground squirrel (Spermophilopsis leptodactylus) is a squirrel species native to grasslands and deserts in northeastern Iran, Tajikistan, Turkmenistan, northwestern Afghanistan, Uzbekistan and Kazakhstan. It is the only member of the tribe Xerini not native to Africa.

References

Thorington, R. W. Jr. and R. S. Hoffman. 2005. Family Sciuridae. Pp. 754–818 in Mammal Species of the World a Taxonomic and Geographic Reference. D. E. Wilson and D. M. Reeder eds. Johns Hopkins University Press, Baltimore.

External links
 Tree of Life: Spermophilopsis leptodactylus

Mammals described in 1823
Mammals of Afghanistan
Mammals of the Middle East
Mammals of Central Asia
Xerini
Taxonomy articles created by Polbot